Isao Ono (born 24 April 1942) is a Japanese biathlete. He competed at the 1968 Winter Olympics, the 1972 Winter Olympics and the 1976 Winter Olympics.

References

1942 births
Living people
Japanese male biathletes
Olympic biathletes of Japan
Biathletes at the 1968 Winter Olympics
Biathletes at the 1972 Winter Olympics
Biathletes at the 1976 Winter Olympics
Sportspeople from Hokkaido